Rudolf "Rudi" Oertel (4 December 1926 – 10 May 2009) was a German diver. He competed in the springboard at the 1960 Summer Olympics and finished in 11th place. Around late 1954 he married Waltraud Skrzipek, a German diver who also competed at the 1960 Olympics in the springboard.

References

External links
 

1926 births
2009 deaths
German male divers
Olympic divers of the United Team of Germany
Divers at the 1960 Summer Olympics
Sportspeople from Gera
20th-century German people